Garetts Bend is an unincorporated community in Lincoln County, West Virginia, United States. Its post office  is closed

References

Unincorporated communities in Lincoln County, West Virginia
Unincorporated communities in West Virginia